Below is a list of special elections to the United States House of Representatives. Such elections are called by state governors to fill vacancies that occur when a member of the House of Representatives dies or resigns before the biennial general election. Winners of these elections serve the remainder of the term and are usually candidates in the next general election for their districts.

In the United States, these contests are called "special elections."  They are sometimes held on the regular Election Day like regular congressional elections but often they are on different days as determined by local statutes.  Despite their name, however, special elections to the U.S. House of Representatives happen often. Furthermore, one published study shows that special elections are explained by the same factors as regular congressional elections. Special elections to the U.S. House have occurred at least once in all states except Iowa and Idaho. A few special elections for territorial delegates to Congress have also been held.

A 2016 study of special elections to the House of Representatives found "that while candidate characteristics affect special election outcomes, presidential approval is predictive of special election outcomes as well. Furthermore, we find that the effect of presidential approval on special election outcomes has increased in magnitude from 1995 to 2014, with the 2002 midterm representing an important juncture in the nationalization of special elections."

List of special elections

Summary 
In a few instances more than one seat was filled in a single special election, but each seat is counted separately in the list below.

See also
 List of special elections to the United States Senate

Notes

References

Sources and external links
 United States Congressional Elections, 1788-1997: The Official Results, by Michael J. Dubin (McFarland and Company, 1998)
 Vacancies in the current Congress, via clerk.house.gov
 List of members for 101st-present, via clerk.house.gov
 Biographical Directory of the United States Congress 1774 - 2005 Contains complete listing of all Congresses

 
United States House of Representatives
United States